Acrogenys is a genus of beetles in the family Carabidae, containing the following species:

 Acrogenys centralis Baehr, 1992
 Acrogenys demarzi Baehr, 1984
 Acrogenys hirsuta Macleay, 1864
 Acrogenys jabiruensis Baehr, 2001
 Acrogenys laticollis Baehr, 1984
 Acrogenys longicollis Gestro, 1875
 Acrogenys lucai Baehr, 2001
 Acrogenys sumlin Baehr, 2001

References

Dryptinae